Riem is a given name and a surname which may refer to:

 Bruno Riem (1923–1992), Swiss modern pentathlete
 Wilhelm Friedrich Riem (1779–1857), German composer and conductor
 Riem de Wolff (1943–2017), half of the 1960s Indonesian and Dutch rock duo the Blue Diamonds
 Riem Hussein (born 1980), German international football referee

Masculine given names